Ivan Mishyn (born March 31, 1985, Odesa, Ukrainian Soviet Socialist Republic) is a Ukrainian rally codriver, Ukrainian rally vice-champion, European rally champion in ERC Production Cup category, and The Boar ProRacing team codriver.

Ivan Mishyn is the only Ukrainian codriver and the only codriver from the former Soviet Union who has won the title of European Rally Champion.

Career

Ukrainian Rally Championship 

Ivan Mishyn's rallying career is inextricably linked to his childhood friend Vitaliy Pushkar. Friends began to visit rallies together as a fans, and also made their debut together as a professional rally crew, where Vitaliy took the driver's role, and Ivan became the codriver. Their first car was the all-wheel drive 2.0 liter Subaru Impreza, which was previously owned by another Odesa driver Igor Chapovsky.

During the 2009 season Pushkar and Mishyn started in 11 rallies with the only retirement at the Bukovina rally, due to technical problems. Such stability has helped friends to become a winners of Ukrainian rally Championship in U12 class for the first year of performances.

Deciding to continue motorsport career at a higher level, the crew changes the car from Subaru Impreza to more modern Mitsubishi Lancer Evo IX, which allows them to fight for victories in the Ukrainian national rally competitions. In the end of 2010 Pushkar and Mishyn got into the top ten fastest Ukrainian crews. Next year Odesites climb a step up in the top five and won its first international trophy - Cup of Friendship, which is held by Automobile Federations of Ukraine, Russia and Belarus together.

The 2013 became the most successful season for the crew at home competitions. As a part of Odesa Rally Team Pushkar and Mishyn won the Chumatskyi Shlyakh rally and became third in the Mariupol rally which made them one of the season favorites, but retirement from Galicia rally weakened their positions. The destiny of the championship had to be decided on the Ivano-Frankivsk Trembita rally, and Vitaliy and Ivan won it - but this was not enough to get the title. Yuriy Kochmar and Sergiy Koval, another crew of Odesa Rally Team, became the Ukrainian class 3 champions leaving Pushkar and Mishyn on the second position.

Intercontinental Rally Challenge 

From the 2010 Pushkar and Mishin are increasingly involved in international competitions. Starting from the several rounds of Latvian and Estonian championships, crew goes on with the Intercontinental Rally Challenge IRC, where they start collaborating with Lithuanian ProRacing team.

Developing the new Mitsubishi Lancer Evo X the crew wins his first major international race - Romanian Rally Sibiu and finishes the 2012 season in sixth place in IRC Production. This success became the highest achievement of Ukrainians in this serie due to fusion of IRC and ERC according to Eurosport Events programme in late 2012.

European Rally Championship 

2013 European Rally Championship season begins for the crew with a confident fifth place in the Latvian 2013 Rally Liepāja-Ventspils, but several retirements on Azores, Belgium and Romania are forced Pushkar and Mishyn stop the participating in ERC that year.

Crew returned to the ERC in 2014 starting the season with an accident at the Jänner Rally. Although, after that Pushkar and Mishyn finished second at the Rally Liepāja–Ventspils and won the Acropolis Rally. At the end of the season, crew safely finished at the Rallye du Valais and Tour de Corse, and after scoring 167 points became the European Rally Champions among the Production Car drivers and codrivers both.

Starts with another drivers 

Among the 79 races held in his career, there are only three where Ivan Mishyn started not with Vitaliy Pushkar. Twice he was the navigator of another Odesa driver, Dmytro Rotkevych, and the crew won the Belarusian rally «Braslau». In addition, once Ivan started as a navigator of multiple Ukrainian Rally Champion Oleksandr Saliuk, Jr., with whom he started in the Tour de Corse, 2012 IRC but failed to get the finish due to technical reasons.

International results

IRC

ERC

ERC Production Cup

Interesting facts and figures 

From 2009 until 2014, Mishyn entered 79 rallies, attaining 17th position in the Ukrainian Club 50 (drivers who have started in 50 or more rallies).

The joint Pushkar/Mishyn crew has 76 starts, second only amongst Ukrainian crews to Gorban/Leonov, with 88 joint starts.

References

1985 births
Living people
European Rally Championship drivers
Ukrainian rally drivers